Don Guidice (October 14, 1932 – March 11, 2010) was an American film editor. He was nominated at the 48th Academy Awards in the category of Best Film Editing (shared with Fredric Steinkamp) for Three Days of the Condor.

Selected filmography

 It Happened at the World's Fair (1963) (uncredited)
 The Greatest Story Ever Told (1965) (assistant editor)
 They Shoot Horses, Don't They? (1969) (assistant editor)
 A New Leaf (1971)
 Jeremiah Johnson (1972) (assistant editor)
 The Yakuza (1974)
 Three Days of the Condor (1975)
 Harry and Walter Go to New York (1976)
 Tilt (1979)
 Hard to Hold (1984)
 Police Academy 2: Their First Assignment (1985)

References

External links
 

American film editors
1932 births
2010 deaths
People from Los Angeles